VT 100 may refer to 
Vermont Route 100
VT100 terminal by Digital Equipment Corporation
the OlivePad VT100, a tablet computer